List of notable Uruguayan Roman Catholic clerics:

A

 Gonzalo Aemilius
 Juan Francisco Aragone

B

 Antonio Barbieri
 Francisco Barbosa 
 Manuel Barreiro 
 Heriberto Bodeant

C

 Roberto Cáceres
 Carlos Collazzi
 Nicolás Cotugno

D

 Pablo Dabezies
 Luis del Castillo Estrada

F

 Arturo Fajardo
 Lorenzo Antonio Fernández

G

 Pablo Galimberti
 José Gottardi

I

L

 José Benito Lamas
 Dámaso Antonio Larrañaga 
 Juan Francisco Larrobla

M

 José Benito Monterroso

N

O

P

 Carlos Parteli
 Miguel Paternain

Q

R

 Francisca Rubatto

S

 Juan Luis Segundo
 Mariano Soler 
 Daniel Sturla

T

 Milton Tróccoli

V

 Jacinto Vera y Durán 
 Mateo Vidal

W

 Rodolfo Wirz

Y

 Inocencio María Yéregui

References

 
Priests
Uruguay
Roman Catholic Clerics